Kingsburg Elementary Charter School District is a school district based in Kingsburg, California in Fresno County.

Schools 
Central Valley Home School (K-8)
Washington Elementary School (K)
Roosevelt Elementary School (1)
Lincoln Elementary School (2-3)
Reagan Elementary School (4-6)
Rafer Johnson Junior High School (7-8)

References

External links
 

School districts in Fresno County, California